Sardar Partap Singh Shankar was an active member of Gurdwara Reform Movement.

He born in Sharikar Village at Jalandhar and also served as viceroy commissioned in Punjab army at Jalandhar. Partap Singh was the father of India's first Defence Minister Swaran Singh. Partap Singh assumed the Public office in 1933 after Gopal Singh Quami's one day tenure as SGPC president. He also won 1923 and 1926 Punjab Legislative Council election from Jullundar (Sikh-Rural) constituency.

References

Members of the Punjab Legislative Council